Péter Ágh (born 30 January 1982) is a Hungarian politician and member of the National Assembly (MP) since 2006. He served as the president of the Fidelitas, youth organization of Fidesz, from 2009 to 2015.

Biography
He was born in Szombathely in 1982. He was a student of the Arts faculty of Pázmány Péter Catholic University. He has been also attending to a political analyst postgraduate course of Századvég Political School.

He has been a member of the local government of Szombathely since 2002. There, he is also a member of the Youth and Educational Commettiee and the Cultural and Civil Relations Committee. He represents his city (which is a seat of county Vas) in the Youth committee of County level Cities Alliance. A member of Fidelitas since 1998. He has been the leader of the group of Szombathely. He was elected to a president of Vas County election Board. Since 2003 national deputy leader of the Youth organisation of his party. Joined FIDESZ in 1999 and member of his party's County Board since 2000. He was delegated to the National Board of Fidesz - Hungarian Civic Union by Fidelitas. He takes part in numerous city embellishment and works of mercy non-profit organizations activity.

He was elected MP from the national list in 2006 elections. He was a member of the Committee on Youth, Social and Family affairs since 2006. He was elected to president of Fidelitas in 2009, succeeding Péter Szijjártó. He became member of parliament again in 2010 from Vas County regional list. He was elected MP for Sárvár in 2014 and 2018. He is involved in the Defense and Law Enforcement Committee.

Personal life
He is married. His wife is Ágota Ágh-Tóth. They have a son, Benedek Péter.

References

External links
 Országgyűlés biography 

1982 births
Living people
Fidesz politicians
Members of the National Assembly of Hungary (2006–2010)
Members of the National Assembly of Hungary (2010–2014)
Members of the National Assembly of Hungary (2014–2018)
Members of the National Assembly of Hungary (2018–2022)
Members of the National Assembly of Hungary (2022–2026)
People from Szombathely